Paradise Hill may refer to:

 Paradise Hill, Nevada, United States, an unincorporated community
 Paradise Hill, Ohio, United States, an unincorporated community
 Paradise Hill, Oklahoma, United States, a town
 Paradise Hill, Saskatchewan, Canada, a village
 Paradise Hill Airport, a former airport

See also
 Paradise Hills (disambiguation)